Woman of Steel is the fourth studio album by Nigerian singer Yemi Alade. It was released on August 30, 2019, through Effyzzie Music Group and Universal Music Africa.  Described by Alade as a "buffet with different kinds of meals and drinks", the album represents a thematic and personal shift in her sound. Musically, it is an Afrobeats record that incorporates elements of R&B and highlife. Woman of Steel features collaborations with Rick Ross, Duncan Mighty, Angélique Kidjo and Funke Akindele. It was supported by the previously released singles "Home" and "Give Dem". Although critical reception to Woman of Steel was mixed, the album was considered to be Alade's best album yet.

Background and promotion
Woman of Steel primarily explores topics such as love, socio-politics and poverty. Yemi Alade spent three years recording the album and said it would be released on August 30, 2019. Musically, Woman of Steel is an Afrobeats record that incorporates elements of R&B and highlife. Alade describes the album as a "buffet with different kinds of meals and drinks". She named the album Woman of Steel to reflect her tough veneer to command the same degree of respect as her male counterparts. Moreover, she derived the title after coming to the realization that she is her own superhero. The album's cover art features Alade wearing a headcap inspired by the Nefertiti Bust artwork. Artists featured on Woman of Steel include Rick Ross, Duncan Mighty, Angélique Kidjo and Funke Akindele. In an interview with The Star newspaper, Alade said some of the songs that made the album were recorded the previous year while others were recorded in August.

Yemi Alade teamed up with Belaire Rosé to launch and promote the album in Lagos, Paris, London, New York and Nairobi. The Lagos edition of the launch party was held at the IMAX Theatre in Lagos; celebrities such as Denrele Edun, Dat Warri Girl, Illbliss and DJ Sose were all present at the event. The launch party in Kenya was held at the Blue Door Restaurant and Lounge in Westlands, Nairobi. Celebrities who attended the event include Chimano, Musyoka, Nadia Mukami, Naiboi, Patricia Kihoro and Victoria Kimani. Alade launched the album in Kenya because she considers Nairobi to be her second home. In October 2019, Alade submitted the album to The Recording Academy for consideration in the Best World Music Album category at the 62nd Annual Grammy Awards.

Composition
The album's opening track "Home" is reminiscent of church music; in it, Alade sings about her appreciation for her love interest. The mid-tempo track "Give Dem" contains Latin strings and an Afrobeats-infused percussion; the song takes a showy route. In "Vibe", Alade portrays herself as a sexually liberated woman; this is exemplified by lyrics like "I want a boy wey go love me scatter, wey nor go knock before e enter, wey go love me pass him sister, give me brain make I mental". In "Night and Day", Alade incorporates guitar melodies found in Soukous music.

The nostalgic track "Shekere" is a remake of Angélique Kidjo's "Wombo Lombo". The reggae track "CIA (Criminal in Agbada)" tackles political corruption. The romantic ballad "Remind You" contains lyrics recorded entirely in conventional English. In the Igbo highlife track "Yeba", Alade speaks about rejecting marriage proposals from two broke men. The Duncan Mighty-assisted track "Shake" has a dancehall feel and is reminiscent of Tekno's "Pana". In the R&B and Afrobeats-infused track "Lai Lai", Alade is acceptant of her love interest despite his humble account balance. In the pro-wealth track "Poverty", Alade denounces poverty and endorses wealth. She enlisted Kenyan singer Ivlyn Mutua to translate the song into Swahili. "Nobody" draws comparisons to Wizkid's "Sweet Love".

Singles
The album's lead single "Home" was released on August 21, 2019. Its production incorporates elements of fuji music and live instrumentation. Alade released a music video and a short film to support the song's release. The music video for "Home" was shot and directed by Alade's frequent collaborator Clarence Peters; in the video, Alade is seen dancing and wearing flashy African attires. The video features a folky narrative and follows Alade and her love interest's romantic relationship at the beach. The short film that accompanied the song's release was written and directed by Clarence Peters. The film depicts an emotional love story between Nneka (Alade) and Austine (Frankincense Eche-Ben). In the film, Nneka escapes an abusive grandmother and a mundane life in rural Nigeria in order to reunite with Austine.

The Krizbeatz-produced track "Give Dem" was also released on August 21, 2019, as the album's second single. The accompanying visuals for "Give Dem" was shot and directed by Clarence Peters; it contains energetic dance moves. The album's third single "Vibe" was released on October 28, 2019. In the video,  Alade demands affection from her love interest and alludes to her lust-driven desires. Dennis Peter of Native magazine described the video for "Vibe" as a "collage of bright, sun-soaked shots that capture the singer at her usual, exuberant best".

The Duncan Mighty-assisted track "Shake" was released on November 20, 2019, as the album's fourth single. The visuals for the song was shot and directed by Paul Gambit. In the video, Alade evokes her sensual side, posing on a bed in a powder blue mesh gown and performing several dance sequences.
The album's fifth single "Remind You" was released on January 22, 2020. The accompanying music video for the song was directed by Ovie Etseyatse; in it, Alade fantasizes about getting dressed in sensual clothes for her love interest Djimon Hounsou.

The album's sixth single "Shekere" was released on February 5, 2020. The song features vocals by Beninese singer Angélique Kidjo and interpolates her 1996 classic "Wombo Lombo". Alade spent three years working on the song and was in contact with Kidjo's brother prior to meeting her. The visuals for "Shekere" was directed by Ovie Etseyatse and highlights various African cultural dances, including the Maasai jumping dance. In the video, Alade is seen in various beaded looks and ankara prints while Kidjo wears a Zulu headdress.

Other releases
The remix of "Oh My Gosh" was released on April 30, 2019. The song features American rapper Rick Ross and is a slight departure from Alade's dance-inducing Afrobeats sound. The accompanying music video for "Oh My Gosh" (Remix) was directed by Ryan Snyder; in the video, Alade and Rick Ross are surrounded by colorfully-clad dancers headed by Izzy Odigie.

Critical reception

Woman of Steel received mixed reviews from music critics. Pulse Nigeria's Motolani Alake awarded the album 6.9 stars out of 10, praising Alade's songwriting skills and commending her for "addressing a myriad of topics" on the project. Alake also opined that the album is Alade's best album yet. A writer for Filter Free Nigeria, who goes by the moniker The Waistbead Whisperer, praised Alade for sticking to her musical formula but ended up criticizing the album's depth, content and lyrics. Mide Michael of TooXclusive did a track-by-track review of the album and granted it 8 stars out of 10; Michael also considers the album to be Alade's best album yet. In a less enthusiastic review, music critic Michael Kolawole said the album is underwhelming despite "offering an abundance of upbeat songs".

Track listing
Credits adapted from AllMusic and other publications.

Notes
"Shekere" interpolates Angélique Kidjo's "Wombo Lombo".

Personnel
Credits adapted from the album's back cover and AllMusic.

Yemi Alade – primary artist, composer, executive producer
Koribo Harrison – executive producer
Taiye Aliyu – executive producer
Segun Ajayi – composer
Rotimi Akinfenwa – composer, production 
Ernest Itiveh – composer, production 
Victor Kpoudosu – composer, production 
Daniel Shekwoyemi – composer, production 
Chris Sunday – composer, production 
Charles Ugo – composer, production 
Funke Akindele – featured artist
Angélique Kidjo – featured artist
Duncan Mighty – featured artist
Rick Ross – featured artist
Adesope Olajide – A&R

Release history

References

2019 albums
Yemi Alade albums
Igbo-language albums
Albums produced by DJ Coublon
Albums produced by Krizbeatz